Monthou-sur-Cher (literally Monthou on Cher) is a commune in the Loir-et-Cher department, central France.

Population

See also
Communes of the Loir-et-Cher department

References

Communes of Loir-et-Cher